Crouzeix's conjecture is an unsolved (as of 2018) problem in matrix analysis. It was proposed by Michel Crouzeix in 2004, and it refines Crouzeix's theorem, which states:

 

The constant   is independent of the matrix dimension, thus transferable to infinite-dimensional settings. The not yet proved conjecture states that the constant is sharpable to :

 

Slightly reformulated, the conjecture can be stated as follows: For all square complex matrices  and all complex polynomials :

 

holds, where the norm on the left-hand side is the spectral operator 2-norm.

While the general case is unknown, it is known that the conjecture holds for tridiagonal 3×3 matrices with elliptic field of values centered at an eigenvalue and for general n×n matrices that are nearly Jordan blocks.  Furthermore, Anne Greenbaum and Michael L. Overton provided numerical support for Crouzeix's conjecture.

Further reading

References

Conjectures
Matrix theory
Unsolved problems in mathematics